The Vitakkasanthana Sutta (MN 20) (The Removal of Distracting Thoughts) is the 20th discourse in Majjhima Nikaya of Pāli Canon in Theravada Buddhism.

Title and content
The Removal of Distracting Thoughts,
The Discursively Thinking Mind, and
The Relaxation of Thoughts.

The  describes five approaches for overcoming negative thoughts. Translators into English have used different terms to designate the purpose, nature, and components of these approaches. One translation begins by stating that

Other translators or commentators refer to five "things," "signs," or "strategies". The purpose of these five approaches is variously described as attaining "higher consciousness," "higher mind," "developing the mind", "heightened mind", or "freedom". To implement these approaches, one is enjoined to "reflect on", "give attention to", "attend to", or "employ" each approach.

 In describing the first of the five approaches, the sutta uses the analogy of a carpenter's peg. In the language of one translation, when the mind has become filled with hatred or illusion by dwelling on a bad ("adventitious") object, the aspirant (bhikku) should replace the bad thought with a good ("skilled") thought (Pali: tato nimittato aññam nimittam):

If thoughts still arise that are "negative" or "evil" and "unskilled", "unwholesome", or "demeritorious," the second recommended approach is as follows: The aspirant should "reflect on the consequences", "ponder on the disadvantages" "examine the danger[s]", or "scrutinize the drawbacks" of such thoughts (Pali: manasikatabbam).

If negative thoughts still continue to arise, the third approach is "withdrawing attention" — that is, the aspirant should "not attend", "not give attention", "be without attention and reflection", "pay no mind and pay no attention", or even "forget" such thoughts.

If the third approach fails to eliminate negative thoughts, the fourth approach involves going "to the root" (Pali: vitakka mula bheda pabbam) by "stilling the thought-formation", "removal of the (thought) source of those unskillful thoughts", "appeasing the whole intentional thought process", or engaging in "the relaxing of thought-fabrication". The sutta compares this to stages of removing the source of physical movement:

The fifth approach (Pali: abhinigganhitabbam; Sanskrit: abhinigrahā), to be pursued when the fourth and all previous approaches together fail to eliminate negative thoughts, is to clench the teeth and "subdue and beat down the (evil) mind by the (good) mind", just as one man may do physical violence to another man.

Commentaries and translations
A commentary on the Vitakkasanthana Sutta was provided in Part III of Conquest of Mind by Eknath Easwaran (1988).

 "The Removal of Distracting Thoughts" (Soma Thera, 1960/1981),
 "The Removal of Distracting Thoughts" (Nanamoli Bhikkhu & Bhikkhu Bodhi, 2005) (as part of a translation of the entire Majjhima Nikaya)
 "The Discursively Thinking Mind" (Sister Uppalavanna) (as part of a translation of the entire Majjhima Nikaya)
 "The Relaxation of Thoughts" (Thanissaro Bhikkhu, 1997)

See also
 List of Majjhima Nikaya suttas

References

External links
 Pali text (transliterated) (beginning at 1.2.10)

Buddhist meditation
Majjhima Nikaya